Nunnington is a village and civil parish in the Ryedale district of North Yorkshire, England. The River Rye runs through. Its population, including Stonegrave, taken at the 2011 census was 361. It is rich in listed historic buildings.

History
Nunnington Hall is a Grade I listed mansion owned by the National Trust and open to the public. The village has 28 other houses and features listed Grade II, including an early 18th-century bridge over the river.

Church
The parish church dedicated to All Saints and St James is a Grade I listed building. The nave and chancel date from the late 13th century and the tower from 1672. The tower, porch and vestry were rebuilt in 1883–1884. There is a fine 17th-century pulpit.

There is a tomb in the church said to belong to a man named Peter Loschy, who slew a dragon in Loschy Wood. In fact, the tomb belongs to Sir Walter de Teyes of Stonegrave Manor.

Notable residents
Former residents of Nunnington have included the writers Annie Keary (1825–1879) and Eliza Harriett Keary (1827–1918) in the 1840s, while their father William Keary (died 1859) was rector. Annie Keary's children's book Mia and Charlie; or a Week's Holiday at Ryedale Rectory (London/Winchester, 1855) recounts the story of a Proud Lady of "Nunningham", who haunts the hall.

Sir Herbert Read, the anarchist poet and critic, was born at nearby Muscoates in 1893 and lived at Muscoates Grange Farm.

Amenities

School
The nearest schools are at Kirkbymoorside and Malton. Nunnington Church of England School dwindled and closed seemingly before the Second World War.

Public transport
It closed to passengers in 1953. The nearest railway station is at Malton (10.2 miles, 16.4 km). There are no public bus services for the village at present.

Gallery

References

External links

Villages in North Yorkshire
Civil parishes in North Yorkshire